Yanwath Hall is a 14th-century and later tower house in Yanwath, Cumbria, England. It is a grade I listed building.

Early owners included the Salkeld family and Richard Dudley.

See also
Listed buildings in Yanwath and Eamont Bridge

References

Grade I listed buildings in Cumbria
Eden District